Keepsake was an American barbershop quartet from Florida that won the 1992 SPEBSQSA International Barbershop Competition. Members of the quartet are Joe Connelly (lead), Tony DeRosa (baritone), Don Barnick (bass), and Roger Ross (tenor).

Discography
 The Entertainer (CD)
 Once Upon a Time (CD)
 Without A Song (CD; 1992)

They also appear on the Heralds of Harmony CD This Joint Is Jumpin.

References

External links
 Discography from Primarily A Cappella
 Discography from Mike Barkley's Monster list
 AIC entry

Professional a cappella groups
Barbershop quartets
Barbershop Harmony Society